Arbab Amir Ayub is a Pakistani politician who had been a member of the National Assembly of Pakistan, from August 2018 till January 2023. Previously he was a member of the National Assembly from November 2017 to May 2018.

Early life and education
Ayub undergraduated in marketing from the United Kingdom.

Political career
Ayub served as a mayor (town nazim) of Peshawar Town 4 from 2005 to 2009 as a candidate of Awami National Party (ANP).

He left ANP to join Pakistan Tehreek-e-Insaf (PTI) in May 2017.

He was elected to the National Assembly of Pakistan as a candidate of PTI from Constituency NA-4 (Peshawar-IV) in by-polls held in October 2017, following the seat fell vacant after the death of Gulzar Khan. He secured 47,586 votes and defeated a candidate of Pakistan Muslim League (N).

He was re-elected to the National Assembly as a candidate of PTI from Constituency NA-28 (Peshawar-II) in 2018 Pakistani general election. He received 74,414 votes and defeated Sabir Hussain Awan, a candidate of Muttahida Majlis-e-Amal (MMA).

References

Living people
Pakistan Tehreek-e-Insaf politicians
Pakistani MNAs 2013–2018
Pakistani MNAs 2018–2023
Year of birth missing (living people)